The 1973 Baltimore International was a men's tennis tournament played on indoor carpet courts at the Towson State College in Baltimore, Maryland in the United States that was part of the 1973 USLTA Indoor Circuit. It was the second edition of the event and was held from January 3 through January 7, 1973. First-seeded Jimmy Connors won the singles title and earned $3,500 first-prize money.

Finals

Singles
 Jimmy Connors defeated  Sandy Mayer 6–4, 7–5
 It was Connors' 1st singles title of the year and the 7th of his career.

Doubles
 Jimmy Connors /  Clark Graebner defeated  Sandy Mayer /  Paul Gerken 3–6, 6–2, 6–3

References

External links
 ITF tournament edition details

Baltimore International
Baltimore International
Baltimore International